Stefan Franczak (August 3, 1917, Jeziorna, Łódź Voivodeship, Poland — 2009) was a Polish Jesuit and horticulturist, famous as a clematis breeder.

In 2009, President of Poland awarded Franchar with Commander's Cross of the order Polonia Restituta for his "outstanding achievements in the field of breeding of ornamental plants and of his contribution to international horticultural advancement".

References

20th-century Polish Jesuits
Polish horticulturists
Recipients of the Order of Polonia Restituta
1917 births
2009 deaths
Plant breeding